Mathangwane is a village in the Central District of Botswana administered under Tutume Sub-district Council. The village is located at the confluence of Shashe and Vukwi rivers, 25 kilometres west of the City of Francistown along the A3 highway and almost entirely on the left bank of Shashe River. The population of the village was 5,075 in the 2011 national population and housing census. The village is characterised by many river valleys, mostly tributaries to Shashe River and used for identifying the village community wards (dikgotlana) boundaries.

History
   
The village is originally an ethnic kalanga and is currently ruled by She Itekeng Mongwaketsi Mathangwane. In 2008, Mathangwane planned celebrations for its centenary anniversary.

In the 1980s, Mathangwane was known for persistent vehicle accidents that occurred at the Shashe River single-lane bridge linking the village to the City of Francistown. At the time, there were rumours that there was a resident evil ghost at the bridge which deceived drivers into driving off the bridge at night causing those mostly fatal vehicle accidents. The old single-track road bridge was replaced in the mid 1990s with a new dual-track single carriageway bridge and those historic vehicle accidents at the bridge river crossing ended.

With the emergence of Francistown as a city in 1997 and the political and economic instability in Zimbabwe, Mathangwane saw an influx of migrants from other tribes of Botswana who couldn't afford accommodation rentals in the new city and illegal immigrants from Zimbabwe who had fled economic collapse and political persecution causing rapid growth to the village population. These influx led to indigenous villagers being made to forfeit their farmland around the village to government for allocation to newcomers for residential use.

In 2003, Mathangwane was made the headquarters of the newly established Tonota-North Constituency following a constitutional amendment which increased the number of constituencies in Botswana from 40 to the current 57 elected seats. The Constituency has since been renamed Shahe-West following a number of heated high level Kgotla meetings in Mathangwane where the majority of residents pointed out their detest of the former name.

Climate

Climate Chart

Tropical Cyclone Dineo
In February 2017, Tropical Cyclone Dineo triggered destructive floods in and around Mathangwane, badly damaging the A3 highway between the City of Francistown and Sebina Junction and further north from the village of Nata to Gweta, badly disrupting traffic with some parts of the road having to be temporarily closed for safety. The damages to the A3 highway later became some kind of death trap, causing a rise in fatal vehicle accidents in and around Mathangwane following delays by the Ministry of Transport and Communications in effecting repairs.

Infrastructure

Schools

There are two primary schools in the Village namely Mathangwane Primary School and Mpatane Primary School, one junior secondary school called Chamabona Junior Secondary School - formally Chamabona Community Junior Secondary School before being completely taken over by the Government, and two day-care centres in Mathangwane. There is no senior secondary school in the Village. After attaining junior certificate, children are often admitted to either Shashe River School, Mater Spei College, Tutume McConnell Community College  or Masunga Senior Secondary School. This arrangement long proved strenuous to underprivileged families with their children dropping from school or performing badly in form five examinations due to the economic pressure.

Roads
With the exception of A3 highway passing through the village, all village internal roads are dirt roads mostly impassable after heavy rains; existing un-bridged river valley crossings within the village long presented a challenge to villagers' free movement during rainy seasons due to this streams regular flooding. Villagers eagerly approved plans for the construction of Mmandunyane-Shashe Mooke-Borolong-Chadibe-Mathangwane road in early 2007 which they viewed as the only hope for the improvement of the village internal roads infrastructures. Arup Botswana was appointed to do the construction of the road which was said to be 70 km in length. It later emerged that in light of the revenue constraints due to then ongoing global economic and financial crisis, the Central District Council (CDC) had to prioritise on its projects and the road was never constructed.

Healthcare facility 
The village healthcare consists of a single clinic staffed with a few full-time general nurses and a single medical doctor handling short term inpatients and outpatients medical reviews. Since the turn of year 2000, the only improvements to the existing clinic was an addition of a Maternity Ward and the installation of a Caravan which serves as a Voluntary HIV Counselling and Testing (VCT) center, a part of the existing Botswana's national HIV treatment programme which saw the Government of Botswana being commended by World Health Organization for demonstrating a very high level of political commitment by successfully addressing the HIV/AIDS epidemic and showing how antiretroviral therapy could be provided on a large scale in resource-constrained settings. The clinic refers seriously ill patients requiring hospitalisation to Nyangabwe Referral hospital and those with severe mental disorder to Jubilee hospital both located in the City of Francistown.

Potable water
The village was connected to Shashe Dam water supply reticulation through the City of Francistown in 2001 which triggered Shashe Dam water treatment plant upgrade works to augment increased water demand. Before the nationwide implementation of The Water Sector Reforms Programme by the government in February 2010 when all existing water supplies and sewage reticulations were taken over by Water Utilities Corporation (WUC), water connections applications and bill payments were only done in Tutume village which is 75 km west of the village at the Local Government offices. WUC has since the take over, opened a local customer service center in the village where all required water services are rendered.

Village shortfalls
Villagers receive Government services from different places with vast geographical distances, i.e. City of Francistown, Tonota, Tutume, Marapong, Masunga and Serowe, and this disadvantage locals from benefiting from existing government programs and services.

Like many Botswana villages, community developments and minor projects that do not require expert consultancy are controlled by a group of volunteers called the Village Development Committee (VDC). Majority of Mathangwane VDC volunteers use it as a platform to gain popularity before joining the village politics; an unproductive and egocentric practice hindering the success of the Village VDC. Villages similar to Mathangwane in size and population through their VDC developed community projects that continue to sustain the livelihood of their villagers, for example, Mathangwane does not have a Community Hall nor rented small business stalls all which are schemes supported by government through community projects and long proved worthy in income generation for small communities like Mathangwane.

Demographics
Mathangwane is divided into community wards or dikgotlana. They are Mathangwane (main community ward), Mpatane, Nkuelegwa, Mashungwa, Matshegong/Mathiwa (nicknamed 'Palamakuwe' for its residents' noisy unruly parting style in the early 1980s), and other community wards that emerged with village growth. Each kgotlana has its own sub-chief or Kgosana. Until recently, Hobona village, 10 km west of Mathangwane along the road from Francistown to Nata was one of the main and oldest community wards of Mathangwane under the leadership of Mfi Kgosana Seitshwenyeng Hobona.

Settlement in the area may have been chosen for the presence of perennial water sources (from the Shashe and Vukwi Rivers).  In the late 20th century the village streached along the river bank from the North to the South with the west being locals' seasonal farm land.  The eastern side of the Shashe River is the North East District and is predominately elite villagers' farm land and ranches administered in Masunga Village. The increase in population and water system reticulation by government saw new settlers being allocated residential land on the underprivileged villagers' seasonal farm land in the west. This prompted locals to informally call the area 'New Xadi' (named after the  government resettlement area for the former Central Kalahari Game Reserve (CKGR) San people in the Ghanzi District).

Politics

Brief History
The Botswana Democratic Party (BDP) dominated the village Local Government Ward politics since the first elections in Botswana in 1965 making the village a BDP stronghold.

Mfi Chite was the first Councillor for the village following a win in the October 1974 general elections; this was after the 1972 constitutional amendment which grouped villages of Borolong, Chadibe, Makobo, Mathangwane, Natale and Shashe Mooke into a single Local Government Ward un-axing them from the then Tonota Local Government Ward. The grouping was broken down further in 1982 constitutional amendment un-axing villages of Borolong, Natale, and Shashemoke from the ward.

Mfi Chite retained the Local Government Ward seat for BDP in both the 1979 and 1984 general elections. Mfi Rabeka HULELA won the village Local Government Ward seat again for BDP in the October 1989 general elections following Mfi Chite's retirement from politics at the end of his office term. Mfi Hulela retained the village Local Government Ward seat for BDP in the October 1994 general election and remained the ward Councillor until her death in 1998, after which the ward remained without a Councillor until the October 1999 general elections when Mfi Tabona MUNYADZWE won the ward again under BDP.

In 2000, Mr. Ookame NTOBEDZI won the ward by-elections under BDP following the passing of Mr. Munyadzwe. In 2003, another constitutional amendment saw Mathangwane being split into two Local Government Wards (Mathangwane North and Mathangwane South). BDP won both Local Government Wards seats in the October 2004 general elections with Mr. Ookame NTOBEDZI representing Mathangwane South and Mfi Gilbert NKHUKHU representing Mathangwane North. In 2007, Mr. Ipuseng CHIKANDA won the by-election of Mathangwane North Local Government Ward seat for the BDP following the passing of Mr. Nkhukhu.

Upsets
With known village political trend, BDP Local Government Wards prospective candidates fiercely contested their party primary elections with the knowledge that a win guaranteed individuals seats at the Local Government Chambers.

Mr. Ookame NTOBEDZI was defeated by Botswana Congress Party (BCP) candidate, Mr. James DLAMINI in Mathangwane South while Mr. Ipuseng CHIKANDA was defeated in Mathangwane North by Mr. Kenosi MABALANE also from BCP in the 2009 General Elections marking the first ever BDP defeat in the village. This surprise defeat of BDP Local Government Wards candidates led to a major campaign in the village in 2010 following the passing of Mr. Baledzi GAOLATHE for the Tonota-North Parliamentary by-elections which BDP won. Opposition parties later accused the ruling party (BDP) of using government resources including public media in their party campaigns and at the same time opposing funding of political parties by government.

The BCP's Local Government surprise victory in the village was viewed as a significant breakthrough in a historical BDP stronghold and opposition parties made an unofficial pact in support of the BCP's Tonota-North Parliamentary candidate, Dr. Habaundi Njiro HOBONA during the 2010 Parliamentary by-election.

BDP comeback;- 2014 General Elections
The Tonota North Constituency was re-named Shashe-West and the Constituency Local Government Wards were re-subdivided into new wards leading to Mathangwane North and Mathangwane South wards being merged into a single but smaller Local Government Ward (reduced by un-axing Chadibe and Hobona which had been constituents of the two previous wards) called Mathangwane Ward to be contested for in the following elections. During the 2014 General Elections, Mr. Nehemiah Gerald HULELA of BDP defeated Mr. Kenosi MABALANE of BCP who had won one of the former constituent wards in the 2009 General Elections.

On 25 November 2018, Hon. Hulela passed on, becoming the fourth village seating Councillor to be deceased in twenty years. The village ward was again left without a Councillor until the 2019 Botswana General Elections like in 1998.

Lead-up to the 2019 Botswana General Elections
In an effort to gain political mileage, the ruling BDP's area MP, Hon. Fidelis MacDonald MOLAO visited villagers in Shashe-West Constituency addressing Kgotla meetings accompanied by the Minister of Transport and Communications announcing that the long-awaited Mmandunyane-Shashe Mooke-Borolong-Chadibe-Mathangwane road construction will begin early 2019. The total distance of the road has now been increased to 82 km and is to include road links to Makobo and Natale villages. The reasons for suspending the road construction earlier after 2007 has been changed by the two ministers from the original statement of averting the impact of the 2008 global recession to now being due to the high number of homesteads which were supposed to be relocated to pave way for the road.

Two former Village Development Committee (VDC) volunteers will be contesting for the village political Local Government Ward seat under the BDP and Umbrella for Democratic Change (UDC) continuing the village tradition where the VDC was converted into a political tool.

2019 Elections BDP Win
The Mathangwane Ward Local Government Elections were eventually won by the BDP with Hon. Samora GABAAKE getting 1,250 votes while Mr. Thabani MODISAOTSILE of UDC got 1,022 votes. The BDP further worn the Shashe West Contituency Parliamentary Elections with Hon. Fidelis MacDonald MOLAO getting 7,181 votes to Mr. Alfred Alfa MASHUNGWA of UDC who got 5,911 votes, Mr. Gaorewe KEAGILE of Alliance for Progressives who got 608 votes and Mr. Blackie Master NDWAPI of Botswana Patriotic Front who got 483 votes.

Industry
The area around Mathangwane consists of crop and cattle farmland. There are also a number of poultry and vegetable farms who supply Francistown and the local market.

Mathangwane does not have a major shopping center but has a cluster of shops and bars mostly along the Francistown-Nata main road, selling clothes, fast food, alcohol, building materials to car and bicycle parts. There are also a number of hair salons that boom around Christmas time specialising in afro-styles. The most stable are a few brick molding entrepreneurs who specialise in pressed concrete bricks and supply locals for individual house construction developments. Trade services such as metal-smiths, plumbing, bricklaying, and electrical installation are supplied by individuals, in a largely unregulated trade.

Just like other villages in the proximity of a city, Mathangane Villagers has a potential to drive their economy from real estate and construction trade. The Village has recently attracted influx of people working in Francistown looking for rented accommodation and outright property purchases; this resulted in a rapid property appreciation in the Village. There is, however, been little growth in the number of job creation. High rates of crime have become a disincentive to permanent settlement and micro business sector growth in the village.

Sports
Football is the most popular sport in Mathangwane. The village, like other villages of Botswana hosts an annual Festive Football Tournament which starts on 25 December during Christmas with group opening matches. The tournament consists of two groups of five teams participating in a round-robin tournament in which each team is scheduled to play four matches against other teams in the same group. This means that a total of ten matches are played within a group. Points are used to rank the teams within a group with three points awarded for each win, one point awarded for each draw and zero points for all losses. The group winners and runners-up progress to the knockout stage. The knockout games are played in one day, normally on New Year's Day with the winner of each group playing against the runner-up from the other group in the morning followed by losers' final game in the afternoon. The losers' final game determines the tournament's third and fourth positions winners and also doubles up as a curtain raiser match for the final game which determines the tournament champions.

The Mathangwane Festive Football Tournament normally attracts sponsorship from individuals and companies who contribute towards price monies to be presented to the players and teams for accomplishments including for awards other than those for the final team positions in the tournament. All top achievers in the tournament are presented with trophies while three top teams members' are each given medals being winners' (gold), runners-up' (silver), and third-place (bronze). The tournament champions also receive the tournament trophy which they keep and return prior to the start of opening matches of the following year's Festive Football Tournament.

Members of the community are charged entrance fees to access the playing ground used for the Festive Football Tournament with small vendors paying more. The money collected at the playing ground entrance is mostly used for tournament logistics including payingoff referees, assistant referees, match commissioners and a private security guard services company which is only engaged for one day for the final games on New Year's Day. For all other games, security is manned by participating teams' representatives nominated by each team prior to the start of the tournament. The tournament normally uses a single playing ground for a single Festive Football Tournament averaging four matches a day with a small rest break to allow for games to continue into the last weekend of the year.

Botswana 50 years of Independence Celebrations

Like many other Villages around Botswana, Mathangwane Village celebrated the Country's 50 years of self-rule on 30 September 2016. The celebrations were hosted at the Village Main Kgotla where a commemorative plaque  near the Kgotla was unveiled for the first time to the public. Churches, traditional dance groups domicile in the Village and Village elders representing the existing Village Wards entertained the crowd through songs, dance and poems. The day marked the first time in the present history that the Main Village Kgotla was filled to capacity by both youths and elders alike.

See also
 Economy of Botswana
 Education in Botswana
 Health in Botswana
 Human rights in Botswana

References 

Villages in Botswana